Pluggable Authentication Services (PAS) allows a SAP user to be authenticated outside of SAP. When the user is authenticated by an external service, the PAS will issue an SAP Logon Ticket or x.509 Certificate which will be used for future authentication into SAP systems. The PAS is generally regarded as an opportunity for companies to either use a new external authentication system or an existing external authentication system. In some cases, the PAS is used with an external single sign-on system that uses SAP Logon Tickets or x.509 certificates.

External authentication systems
 Windows NT LAN Manager Authentication
 Windows NT domain controller (i.e., User ID and password verification)
 Binding LDAP to a directory server
 Authentication using the Secure Sockets Layer (SSL) protocol and x.509 certificates
 HTTP header variables (mapping userIDs)
 Authentication mechanism through the AGate

Prerequisites
 One system must be configured as the ticket-issuing system.
 Other SAP systems must be configured to accept logon tickets (and therefore preconditions for logon ticket configuration or non-logon ticket configuration, such as certificate, must be met prior).
 Usage of Secure Network Communications because authentication occurs externally.
 Ticket-issuing SAP system must be able to recognize user's ID.

See also
Single sign-on
Secure Network Communications
SAP GUI
SAP Logon Ticket

External links
 Pluggable Authentication Services for External Authentication Mechanisms

References

SAP SE